T&T Supermarket is a Canadian supermarket chain that sells primarily Asian foods. The company is headquartered in Richmond, British Columbia. In 1993, the first T&T was opened in Burnaby's Metropolis at Metrotown, a shopping centre in the Metrotown area in the Greater Vancouver region. As of 2014, T&T's CEO is Tina Lee, who succeeded her mother Cindy Lee.

In addition to the many departments found in a regular supermarket, most T&T stores also have an in-house bakery, an Asian deli, a sushi and Chinese barbecue department.

"T&T" is a reference to the names of Cindy Lee's two daughters, Tina and Tiffany, as well as to the names of the two major investors involved when the company was founded in 1993, Tawa Supermarket Inc. and Uni-President Enterprises Corp.

History

Establishment of T&T
The chain had been created as a joint venture of Uni-President Enterprises Corporation, one of Taiwan's ten largest conglomerates; Tawa Supermarket Inc., a California-based chain of Asian supermarkets; and a group of Canadian investors. Founder Cindy Lee is a Taiwanese-Canadian who started the business with one store in 1993.

Exploitation lawsuit 

On March 5, 2007, The Tyee reported a case of a foreign temporary worker who claimed to had been exploited, and had his passport seized by T&T Supermarket. According to The Tyee's coverage, "In a notice of claim filed with the small claims division of the provincial court of BC, Gui Qiang Zou claims he was pressured into working longer hours for lower wages than promised after the firm kept his passport and other key documents."

Acquisition by Loblaw
T&T is part of Loblaw Companies, which purchased it in July 2009 for $225 million in consideration, consisting of $191 million in cash and $34 million in preferred shares. The consideration paid above and beyond the tangible asset base of the company (i.e. the accounting goodwill) which was estimated at $180 million.

Expansion
With rapid expansion, T&T is Canada's largest Asian supermarket chain. It has thirteen stores in British Columbia (all in Metro Vancouver), one in Québec, seven in Alberta (four in Calgary and three in Edmonton), and ten stores in Ontario (eight in the Greater Toronto Area, one in Waterloo, and one in Ottawa).

Launch of T&T brand and rewards program 
In 2012, T&T launched its own T&T brand, a collection of private label products such as crackers, dumplings, cakes, pastries, green tea and marinade sauce. The company also started a rewards program for its customers who can collect points and redeem them in-store for gifts.

Unionization issues 
Huff Post Business Canada reported on July 17, 2012 that workers at a T&T Supermarket warehouse in Scarborough, Ontario, would head to a secret ballot vote on Monday, July 23, 2012 for unionization. The United Food and Commercial Workers (UFCW) filed an application for certification with the Ontario Labour Relations Board on July 16, 2012. According to UFCW national representative Kevin Shimmin, the workers at the T&T Supermarket Scarborough warehouse, are seeking unionization to attempt improving scheduling issues as well as tying wage more closely to seniority, instead of favouritism. Shimmin gave in the article an example that Warehouse staffs at T&T Supermarket are working a 39-hour work week, spanning six days in a week. He also pointed out that there are cases where staff have been working for T&T Supermarket for three years and are still earning a minimum wage of $10.25 per hour. Paul Ho, marketing manager for the grocery chain in Ontario, said he did not have details about wages, but maintained that work hours "vary from individual to individual, and depends on the production schedule."

The Globe and Mail reported on July 23, 2012 the result of T&T Supermarket Scarborough warehouse staff unionization. About 100 employees at the T&T Scarborough warehouse voted in the secret ballot vote on Monday July, 23.  However, the Ontario Labour Relations Board sealed the ballot box for review. Dispute arose as the UFCW and T&T Supermarket argued about the eligibility of the voters in the voter list.  UFCW national representative Kevin Shimmin said that the dispute caused the secret ballot vote to be reviewed, while Cindy Lee, founder at T&T Supermarket claimed that it was the decision of the Ontario Labour Relations Board to look into whether the union has enough support from employees to in the first place file the application.

Largest T&T store and development of e-commerce platform
In 2018, T&T opened a 74,000 sq. ft. flagship store in Richmond, British Columbia, which was the first to have a live seafood bar, an Asian street food station, and self-checkouts. Industry experts dubbed the store a "grocerant" because of its restaurant-style offering.

In 2020, T&T launched its e-commerce platform, facilitating online order and delivery of Asian food products across most provinces in Canada.

Locations

British Columbia

 Burnaby – Metropolis at Metrotown 
 Coquitlam (2) – Coquitlam Centre and Woolridge Street (opening late 2022)
 Langley – Willowbrook Shopping Centre
 Richmond (3) – Richmond Oval Village, Yaohan Centre (Osaka Supermarket) and Lansdowne Centre
 Surrey (2) – Impact Plaza and Central City 
 Vancouver (4) – Keefer Place (Chinatown), First Avenue Square,  Kensington Gardens and Marine Gateway
 West Vancouver – Park Royal Shopping Centre (Osaka Supermarket)

Alberta

 Calgary (4) – Pacific Place Mall, Harvest Hills Crossing, Deerfoot Meadows and Sage Hill Plaza
 Edmonton (3) – West Edmonton Mall, North Town Centre and South Edmonton

Ontario

 Aurora – Bayview Avenue and St. John's Sideroad
 Markham (3) – Cachet Centre, Langham Square and New Horizon Centre
 Mississauga – Central Parkway and Mavis Road 
 Ottawa –  Hunt Club Road and Riverside Drive 
 Richmond Hill – Yonge Street and Weldrick Road
 Toronto (2) – College Street and Spadina Avenue and Fairview Mall (opening Winter 2022)
 Vaughan – Promenade
 Waterloo – Westmount Place

Quebec
 Montreal – Saint-Laurent (largest T&T store in Canada)

Former Locations
T&T had two stores in Toronto which have closed. 
 The Cherry Street location closed on January 30, 2020 with the redevelopment of the Port Lands after operating for 12 years.

 The Milliken Crossings location (Middlefield and Steeles) closed in 2015 and now houses another Asian retailer.

Awards
In 2018, the Retail Council of Canada awarded the Canadian Grand Prix Trailblazer Lifetime Achievement Award to founder Cindy Lee and CEO Tina Lee for having "demonstrated outstanding service and dedication to the Canadian retail and grocery industry." Cindy Lee received the lifetime achievement award at the 2019 Chinese Canadian entrepreneur awards in recognition of her contributions to the Chinese Canadian business community.

See also

List of supermarket chains in Canada

References

External links

 

Chinese-Canadian culture in British Columbia
Companies based in Richmond, British Columbia
Loblaw Companies
Retail companies established in 1993
Supermarkets of Canada
Food and drink companies based in British Columbia
1993 establishments in British Columbia